PlayStation 2 models were produced from 2000 to 2013. Some PlayStation 2 (PS2) revisions only change in their internal construction while others feature substantial external changes. Each region receives a different model number; for example, the V18 was released in North America as SCPH-90001, in Australia as SCPH-90002, and in Hong Kong as SCPH-90006. The final digit is a region code with no bearing on the hardware; many games and DVDs are restricted to certain regions, and the system software displays in different languages.

The PS2 is primarily differentiated between models with the original "fat" case design and "slimline" models introduced at the end of 2004. In 2010, a television incorporating a PS2 was introduced.

Original case design

Three of the original PS2 launch models (SCPH-10000, SCPH-15000, and SCPH-18000) were only sold in Japan and lacked the expansion bay of later PS2 models. These models instead included a PCMCIA slot. SCPH-10000 and SCPH-15000 did not have built-in DVD movie playback and instead relied on encrypted playback software that was copied to a memory card from an included CD-ROM (normally, the PS2 will only execute encrypted software from its memory card; see PS2 Independence Exploit). V3 had a substantially different internal structure from the subsequent revisions, featuring several interconnected printed circuit boards. In V4, everything except the power supply was unified onto one board. V5 introduced minor internal changes, and the only difference between V6 (sometimes called V5.1) and V5 is the orientation of the Power/Reset switch board connector, which was reversed to prevent the use of no-solder modchips. V5 also introduced a more reliable laser than the ones used in previous models. V7 and V8 included only minor revisions to V6.

There was also the SCPH-3000x, 3500x, 3900x, and 500xx models.

Beginning with model SCPH-500xx (v9 & 10), the i.LINK port was removed. An infrared receiver was added for use with a remote to control DVD playback, leaving both controller ports free from the external receiver.

The PS2 standard color is matte black. Several different variations in color were produced in different quantities and regions, including ceramic white, light yellow, metallic blue (aqua), metallic silver, navy (star blue), opaque blue (astral blue), opaque black (midnight black), pearl white, Sakura purple, satin gold, satin silver, snow white, super red, transparent blue (ocean blue), and also Limited Edition color Pink, which was distributed in regions including Oceania and parts of Asia.

Slimline case designs

In September 2004, Sony unveiled its third major hardware revision (V12, model number SCPH-700xx). Available in late October 2004, it is smaller, thinner, and quieter than the older versions and includes a built-in Ethernet port (in some markets it also has an integrated modem). Due to its thinner profile, it does not contain the 3.5" expansion bay and therefore does not support the internal hard disk drive. It also lacks an internal power supply, similar to the GameCube, and has a modified Multitap expansion. The removal of the expansion bay results in incompatibility with games that require the HDD expansion, such as Final Fantasy XI.

There are two sub-versions of the SCPH-700xx, one with the old Emotion Engine (EE) and Graphics Synthesizer (GS) chips, and the other with the newer unified EE+GS chip, but otherwise are identical. The sub-versions are variously referred to as V12 for both models, V11.5 for the older and V12 for the newer model, and V12 for the older and V13 for the newer model. The V12 model was first released in black, but a silver edition was available in the United Kingdom, Germany, Australia, United Arab Emirates and other GCC countries, France, Italy, South Africa, and North America. A limited edition pink console also became available after March 2007.

V12 (or V13) was succeeded by V14 (SCPH-7500x), which contains different ASICs than previous revisions, with some chips having a copyright date of 2005, compared to 2000 or 2001 for earlier models. It also has a different lens and some compatibility issues with a different number of PlayStation games and even some PS2 games. An addon to add HDD support to newer 7500x and onward models called the HDPro was created but had limited success.

In the beginning of 2005, it was found that some black slimline console power transformers manufactured between August and December 2004 were defective and could overheat. The units were recalled by Sony and replaced by a 2005 model.

Later hardware revisions had better compatibility with PlayStation games (Metal Gear Solid: VR Missions operates on most silver models); however, the new Japanese slim models have more issues with playing PlayStation games than the first PS2 revisions.

In 2006, Sony released new hardware revisions (V15, model numbers SCPH-7700xa and SCPH-7700xb). V15 was first released in Japan on September 15, 2006, including the Silver edition. After its release in Japan, it was then released in North America, Europe and other parts of the world. The new revision uses an integrated, unified EE+GS chip, a redesigned ASIC, a different laser lens, an updated BIOS, and updated drivers.

On July 19, 2007, Sony started shipping a revision of the slimline PlayStation 2 (SCPH-7900x) featuring a reduced weight of 600 grams compared to 900 g of the SCPH-7700x, achieved through a reduction in parts. The unit also uses a smaller motherboard as well as a custom ASIC which houses the EE, GS, and the RDRAM. The AC adaptor's weight was reduced to 250 g from the previous 350 g.

Another refinement of the slimline PlayStation 2 (SCPH-9000x) was released in Japan on November 22, 2007. On SCPH-9000x series consoles manufactured after the third quarter of 2008 as the last revision of the PlayStation 2, some changes were made (indicated by date code 8C) to incorporate a revised BIOS, which disables an exploit present in all older models that allowed homebrew applications to be launched from a memory card.

PSX

Sony also manufactured a consumer device called the PSX that can be used as a digital video recorder and DVD burner in addition to playing PS2 games. The device was released in Japan on December 13, 2003, and was the first Sony product to include the XrossMediaBar interface. It did not sell well in Japan, and was not released anywhere else.

The PSX featured one USB port, a Memory Stick card reader and two PlayStation 2 Memory Card slots.

Sony BRAVIA KDL22PX300

Released in Europe in 2010, the Sony BRAVIA KDL22PX300 is a 22-inch (56 cm) 720p television that incorporates a PlayStation 2 console with a disc cover that can be opened by pressing the "Open" button and closed by sliding it and four HDMI ports. The TV also includes BRAVIA Internet Video Access, allowing users access to streaming services such as YouTube and on-demand television. Although the maximum resolution of the screen is 720p, 1080p input sources can be used and displayed.

As this TV was only released in Europe, it is a PAL-region system that could only play PAL games and software.

See also
 PlayStation models
 PlayStation 3 models

References

PlayStation 2
Sony consoles